Inteligencia del Servicio Penitenciario Federal (Federal Penitentiary Service Intelligence) is the intelligence agency of the Federal Penitentiary Service of Argentina, and it is controlled by the Ministry of Justice.

See also

Argentine Federal Police
Federal Penitentiary Service
Interior Security System
National Intelligence System
National Directorate of Criminal Intelligence

Federal law enforcement agencies of Argentina
Argentine intelligence agencies